Chuwa Dam  is an earthfill dam located in Hokkaido Prefecture in Japan. The dam is used for irrigation. The dam impounds about 21  ha of land when full and can store 2132 thousand cubic meters of water. The construction of the dam was completed in 1924.

References

Dams in Hokkaido